The South African Bureau of Racial Affairs (SABRA) (Afrikaans: Suid-Afrikaanse Buro vir Rasse-Angeleenthede) was a South African think tank based at Stellenbosch University. It was founded in 1948 at the initiative of the Afrikaner Broederbond as an alternative to the liberal South African Institute of Race Relations. It sought to give an academic and theoretical justification for the National Party's policy of Apartheid, and influenced the development of that policy during the 1950s and beyond. A number of SABRA members made an important contributors to the Tomlinson Commission, which formulated a strategy for developing the Bantustans.

References 

Organisations associated with apartheid
Apartheid in South Africa
Politics and race
Stellenbosch University
Think tanks based in South Africa